On October 14, 1912, former saloonkeeper John Flammang Schrank (1876–1943) attempted to assassinate former U.S. President Theodore Roosevelt while he was campaigning for the presidency in Milwaukee, Wisconsin. Schrank's bullet lodged in Roosevelt's chest after penetrating Roosevelt's steel eyeglass case and passing through a thick (50 pages) single-folded copy of the speech titled "Progressive Cause Greater Than Any Individual", which he was carrying in his jacket. Schrank was immediately disarmed (by Czech immigrant Frank Bukovsky) and captured; he might have been lynched had Roosevelt not shouted for Schrank to remain unharmed. Roosevelt assured the crowd he was all right, then ordered police to take charge of Schrank and to make sure no violence was done to him. Roosevelt did not believe in police harming civilians.

As an experienced hunter and anatomist, Roosevelt correctly concluded that since he was not coughing blood, the bullet had not reached his lung; he declined suggestions to go to the hospital immediately. Instead, he delivered his scheduled speech. His opening comments to the gathered crowd were, "Ladies and gentlemen, I don't know whether you fully understand that I have just been shot, but it takes more than that to kill a Bull Moose."

Afterwards, probes and an x-ray showed that the bullet had lodged in Roosevelt's chest muscle, but did not penetrate the pleura. As doctors concluded that it would be less dangerous to leave it in place than to attempt to remove it, Roosevelt carried the bullet with him for the rest of his life. Both President William Howard Taft and Democratic nominee Woodrow Wilson suspended their own campaigning until Roosevelt recovered and resumed his. When asked if the shooting would affect his election campaign, he said to the reporter "I'm fit as a bull moose." The bull moose became a symbol of both Roosevelt and the Progressive Party; it often was referred to as simply the Bull Moose Party. He spent two weeks recuperating before returning to the campaign trail. He later wrote a friend about the bullet inside him, "I do not mind it any more than if it were in my waistcoat pocket."

The shooter, John Schrank, initially pleaded guilty to the charge of attempted murder, but the trial judge, unconvinced of Schrank's sanity, declined his plea and the case was brought to trial. Schrank was found not guilty by reason of insanity by the jury and was sentenced to indefinite institutionalization.

Assassination attempt

The 1912 presidential election campaign was characterized by a serious split in the Republican Party between the conservative wing under President William Howard Taft and the liberal/reform wing under ex-President Theodore Roosevelt. After a bitter confrontation at the Republican Convention, Taft won renomination. Roosevelt led a bolt of his followers, who held a convention and nominated him for president on the ticket of the Progressive Party, nicknamed the "Bull Moose Party". Taft and his supporters attacked Roosevelt for being power-hungry and seeking to break the tradition that U.S. Presidents only serve up to two terms in office.

According to documents found on Schrank after the attempted assassination, Schrank had written that the ghost of William McKinley came to him in a dream and told Schrank to avenge his death, pointing to a picture of Theodore Roosevelt. Ultimately, on October 14, 1912, while Roosevelt was campaigning in Milwaukee, Wisconsin, Schrank attempted to assassinate him.

Roosevelt was at the Gilpatrick Hotel, at a dinner provided by the hotel's owner, a supporter. The ex-President was scheduled to deliver a speech at the Milwaukee Auditorium. News had circulated that Roosevelt was at the hotel, and Schrank (who had been following Roosevelt from New Orleans to Milwaukee) went to the hotel. The ex-president had finished his meal and left the hotel to enter an open car.  Roosevelt stood to acknowledge the cheering of the assembled crowd, and Schrank acted.

Schrank did shoot Roosevelt, but the bullet lodged in Roosevelt's chest only after hitting both his steel eyeglass case and a 50-page copy of his speech titled "Progressive Cause Greater Than Any Individual", which he was carrying in his jacket pocket. As onlookers gasped and screamed, Elbert E. Martin, one of Roosevelt's secretaries and an ex-football player, was the first to react, leaping at Schrank, wrestling him to the ground and seizing his gun. A. O. Girard, a former Rough Rider and bodyguard of the ex-president, and several policemen were upon Schrank at the same moment. Roosevelt stumbled, but straightened himself, and again raised his hat, with a reassuring smile upon his face. His aide, Harry Cochems, asked Roosevelt if he was hit, and Roosevelt simply said assuredly, "He pinked me, Harry."

As Schrank was subdued and held up on his feet, the crowd went into a frenzy. Several of the closest men around Schrank began pummeling him, and others screamed "kill him!", and "hang him!". Roosevelt, seeing what was happening, shouted to the crowd, "Don't hurt him. Bring him here. I want to see him." The crowd, hearing Roosevelt's voice, looked at Roosevelt, astonished to see him standing up and talking. A member asked, "Is he okay?"; Roosevelt, with a reassuring smile, waved his hat in the air and said, "I'm all right, I'm all right." In relief, the crowd erupted in cheers, enabling four policemen to gain their way into the crowd and hold Schrank. Roosevelt ordered, "Bring him to me." Schrank was led to Roosevelt, and the two men looked into each other's eyes. Putting his hands on Schrank's head so he could look at him, and to determine if he had seen him before, Roosevelt said to Schrank, "What did you do it for?" Getting no response, he said, "Oh, what's the use? Turn him over to the police." As police held Schrank, Roosevelt looked down at him, and said, "You poor creature." Roosevelt ordered, "Officers, take charge of him, and see that there is no violence done to him." Girard and another officer led Schrank away into the hotel as the crowd booed at him and applauded for Roosevelt, abiding by his wishes. Roosevelt gave another reassuring tip of the hat to the crowd before he took off in his car. Schrank was led into the kitchen where he was turned over to the local police.

Roosevelt, as an experienced hunter and anatomist, correctly concluded that since he was not coughing blood, the bullet had not reached his lung, and he declined suggestions to go to the hospital immediately. Instead, he delivered his scheduled speech with blood seeping into his shirt. He spoke for 84 minutes before completing his speech and accepting medical attention. His opening comments to the gathered crowd were, "Ladies and gentlemen, I don't know whether you fully understand that I have just been shot, but it takes more than that to kill a Bull Moose."

Afterwards, probes and an x-ray showed that the bullet had lodged in Roosevelt's chest muscle, but did not penetrate the pleura. Doctors concluded that it would be less dangerous to leave it in place than to attempt to remove it, and Roosevelt carried the bullet with him for the rest of his life. In later years, when asked about the bullet inside him, Roosevelt would say, "I do not mind it any more than if it were in my waistcoat pocket."

Both Taft and Democratic nominee Woodrow Wilson suspended their own campaigning until Roosevelt recovered and resumed his. When asked if the shooting would affect his election campaign, he said to the reporter, "I'm fit as a bull moose", which inspired the party's emblem. Roosevelt made only two more speeches in the campaign. Although Roosevelt won more votes and electoral votes than Taft, Wilson bested both of them to win the presidency.

Perpetrator

John Flammang Schrank (March 5, 1876 – September 15, 1943) was a Bavarian-born saloonkeeper from New York who attempted to assassinate former U.S. President Theodore Roosevelt on October 14, 1912, in Milwaukee, Wisconsin. Schrank was born in Erding, Bavaria, on March 5, 1876. He emigrated to the U.S. at the age of 9. His parents died soon after, leaving Schrank to work for his uncle, a New York tavern owner and landlord. Upon their deaths, Schrank's aunt and uncle left him valuable properties, with the expectation that Schrank could live a quiet and peaceful life. Schrank was heartbroken, not just because he had lost his second set of parents, but also because his first and only girlfriend Emily Ziegler had died in the General Slocum disaster on New York's East River. Schrank sold the properties, and drifted around the East Coast for years. He became profoundly religious, and a fluent Bible scholar, whose debating skills were well known around his neighborhood's watering holes and public parks. He wrote spare and vivid poetry. He spent a great deal of time walking around city streets at night but caused no documented trouble. 

Roosevelt, who had left office three and a half years earlier, was running for president as a member of the Progressive Party. During a Roosevelt campaign speech in Milwaukee, Wisconsin, Schrank, who had been stalking him for weeks, shot Roosevelt once in the chest with a .38-caliber Colt Police Positive Special revolver. The 50-page text of his campaign speech folded over twice in Roosevelt's breast pocket and a metal glasses case slowed the bullet, saving his life. Schrank was immediately disarmed, captured and might have been lynched had Roosevelt not shouted for Schrank to remain unharmed.

Aftermath
Soon after the assassination attempt, psychologists examined Schrank and reported that he had "insane delusions, grandiose in character," declaring him to be insane. At his trial, the would-be assassin claimed that William McKinley's ghost had visited him in a dream and told him to avenge his assassination by killing Roosevelt. Schrank was committed to the Central State Hospital for the Criminally Insane in Waupun, Wisconsin, in 1914. He remained there for 29 more years, until he died on September 15, 1943, of bronchial pneumonia. His body was donated to the medical school at Marquette University (now the Medical College of Wisconsin) for anatomical dissection.

Archive
While John F. Schrank was committed, he wrote a number of letters to the doctor he was consulting at the mental hospital, Adin Sherman. The University of North Carolina at Wilmington possesses twenty of them. The letters are dated between 1914 and 1918. The accession number in the Manuscripts Collection is 148. 

The Milwaukee Public Library contains a collection of court exhibits and transcripts from Schrank's trial. It is Local History Manuscript Collection 43.

References

Further reading
 
 Foley, William J. "A bullet and a Bull Moose." JAMA Journal of the American Medical Association 209.13 (1969): 2035–38.
 
 Helferich, Gerard. Theodore Roosevelt and the Assassin: Madness, Vengeance, and the Campaign of 1912 (2013)   excerpt

External links
Theodore Roosevelt (attempted assassination), Wisconsin Dictionary of History, Wisconsin Historical Society
Images at Library of Congress

Crime in Milwaukee
Roosevelt, Theodore
Theodore Roosevelt
Attempted assassinations of presidents of the United States
Political history of Wisconsin